Perfect Man is the fifth Korean studio album by South Korean boy band Shinhwa. It was released on March 29, 2002, by SM Entertainment. The title track "Perfect Man", includes lyrics with a persuasive love theme, it was followed by second single entitled, "I Pray 4 U".

The album debuted at number one on the monthly Korean Chart, becoming Shinhwa's second number-one album. It sold 355,333 copies, and remained on the chart for a total of 23 weeks. The album placed at No. 14 on the year-end chart "Top 100 Albums in 2002".

Music video
For their music video "Perfect Man", Shinhwa each held a bouquet of yellow flowers.  Each members in the music video portray different people, with Lee Min-woo walking and singing first, holding his bouquet of yellow flowers and transition into Kim Dong-wan, who drove an ATV. Dongwan later changed into Andy, who is a businessman in the music video, when he enters an elevator. Andy later change into Jun Jin while doing push ups in the gym, and then change into Shin Hye-sung while he sat in a car. Hyesung walks behind a glass door that blurs his figure, and the music video switches to where Shinhwa is dancing, each with a microphone stand before them.  Eric is shown rapping, and he then walks out from the other side of the glass door which Hyesung had stepped in from. The music video ended with the members throwing their bouquet of yellow flowers and dancing on a stage with a crowd screaming.

Their music video for "I Pray 4 U" was much more simple, showing the members singing around a boat (owned by Minwoo in the music video). It also showed the members playing basketball against each other.

Andy's return
Andy, who did not participate in their fourth album Hey, Come On!, came back to participate in this one. Despite him not participating in the fourth album, whenever Shinhwa performs one of their song from the fourth album, Andy was given a line that was previously either Eric's or Jun Jin's. One such example was Hey, Come On!. Originally, Jun Jin was the one who was rapping in the beginning but whenever they perform the song at their concert or such, Andy was given the task to rap it.

Accolades

Track listing
Information is adapted from the liner notes of Perfect Man:

Charts

Personnel
Information is adapted from the liner notes of Perfect Man:

Album production
 Lee Soo-man - producer
 KAT - recording engineer, mixing engineer
 Yeo Doo-hyeon - recording engineer, mixing engineer
 Lee Seong-ho - recording engineer
 Kim Beom-gu - recording engineer
 Kim Yong-seong - recording engineer
 Kwak Seung-eun - recording engineer
 Eom Chan-yong - recording engineer
 Jeon Hoon - mastering engineer

Guitar
 Groovie K - "Perfect Man"
 Hong Joon-ho - "Shout", "Last Zone"
 Sam Lee - "Free", "Fly High"
 Lee Geun-hyeong - "Endless Love", "Red Angel"
 Lee Seong-wol - "Honesty"
 Tommy Kim - "Reason"
 Jeong Ki-seong - "In Your Love"

Bass
 Shin Hyeon-kwon - "Free"

Strings
 Oh Jo-han 5 - "Endless Love"

Release history

References

2002 albums
Shinhwa albums
SM Entertainment albums